Palazzo Pucci may refer to:
Palazzo Pucci, Florence
Palace of the Holy Office, Rome, originally built as Palazzo Pucci

Architectural disambiguation pages